The discography of American singer and dancer Paula Abdul consists of three studio albums, one remix album, five compilation albums, eight video albums, seventeen singles, and seven other appearances. Having found success as a choreographer for artists such as Janet Jackson, Abdul launched her own music career with the release of her debut studio album Forever Your Girl (1988). The album topped the Billboard 200 chart, and to date holds the record for the longest climb to number one for an album. The project spawned a number of successful singles, and is one of only nine albums to have four singles top the Billboard Hot 100 chart. It went on to earn a seven-times platinum certification from the Recording Industry Association of America (RIAA).

Abdul released the Shut Up and Dance: Mixes (1990) remix album to a positive commercial reaction, earning a platinum certification from the RIAA. She continued to find success with the release of Spellbound (1991), her second studio album. It debuted at number five on the Billboard 200, climbing to the top soon after it was released. The album's first two singles both topped the Hot 100 chart with the first, "Rush Rush" becoming first number-one single in six years to spend more than four weeks on top. Third single "Blowing Kisses in the Wind" reached the top ten. Despite the album's achievements, it failed to match the success of its predecessor. Following a musical hiatus while dealing with personal issues, Abdul returned with the release of Head over Heels (1995), her third and final studio effort. The album and coinciding singles were deemed commercial failures, and were met with a mixed reaction from critics. Following the release of the album, Abdul entered a second musical hiatus.

Abdul released the single "Dance Like There's No Tomorrow" (2008) with Randy Jackson, her first single in twelve years. She later released "I'm Just Here for the Music" (2009) the following year.

Throughout her career, she has sold over 50 million records worldwide. Billboard listed her as the 92nd Greatest Artist of all Time. She is recognized as the reigning "Dance-pop Princess" by the media while others says she is the original "Pop Princess" of her generation. According to RIAA, She has sold 11.5 million certified albums in the United States.

Albums

Studio albums

Compilation albums

Remix albums

Extended plays

Singles

Other appearances

Videos

Video albums

Other video albums

Music videos

Footnotes

See also
 List of best-selling remix albums
 List of Billboard number-one singles (United States)
 List of number-one dance hits (United States) 
 List of number-one adult contemporary hits (United States)
 Billboard Year-End number one singles
 List of number-one singles (Canada)
 List of UK top 10 singles in 1991 
 List of songs with most weeks at number-two (Australia)

References

External links

Discography
Discographies of American artists
Pop music discographies